Gooseville is an unincorporated community located in the town of Sherman, in Sheboygan County, Wisconsin, United States.

Historical landmarks
The Gooseville Mill/Grist Mill is listed on the National Register of Historic Places.

Images

Notes

Unincorporated communities in Wisconsin
Unincorporated communities in Sheboygan County, Wisconsin